The 2008–09 Boston University Terriers Men's ice hockey season was the 81st season of play for the program and 25th in Hockey East. They represented Boston University in the 2008–09 NCAA Division I men's ice hockey season. The Terriers were coached by Jack Parker, in his 36th season, and played their home games at Agganis Arena. The team won the 2009 NCAA Division I men's ice hockey tournament, the 5th national championship in program history.

Season
Entering the year, Boston University had been a program in limbo for several years. While Jack Parker had no trouble recruiting talented players for the Terriers (nearly half of the roster was made up of NHL-drafted players), that hadn't translated into many victories for BU. Over the previous four years, the Terriers had good finishes in the regular season but had squandered several tournament appearance by losing 3 of their last 4 postseason games.

This year, the team's fortunes would hinge on the performance of two freshmen goaltenders, Kieran Millan and Grant Rollheiser, who would vie to take over the starting from the less-than stellar Brett Bennett. At the beginning of the year, the two netminders shared the crease and both played well over the first few weeks of the campaign. By late-November, however, Millan had established himself as the better of the two and would remain a fixture in goal for the rest of the season. Rollheiser got some playing time and did look very capable when he was in the cage, but Millan put up one of the most stellar freshman performances in the history of the NCAA.

BU's goaltenders were insulated by a star-studded cast of defensemen, many of whom would reach the highest level of the game, including Eric Gryba, Brian Strait and Kevin Shattenkirk. It was, however, Matt Gilroy, the team's senior co-Captain who led the defensive corps. While Gilroy led the club in points from the blueline, he was also a standout by wearing the number 97. Jack Parker typically did not allow his players to wear any number above 39, however, Gilroy was a special case. Growing up, Matt and his younger brother Timmy wore numbers 98 and 97 respectively in honor of Wayne Gretzky. That changed when Timmy died in a bicycle accident at the age of 8. Afterwords, Matt Gilroy wore his brother's number and when he told Parker his reasons why, the old-school BU coach made an exception for Gilroy.

Up front, the Terriers were a very deep team. Led by a 7th-overall pick in Colin Wilson, the Terriers had the #1 offense in the nation. BU had 17 players reach double-digit points on the year and averaged just under 4 goals per game. With all of those elements, the Terriers produced one of the best single-season performances in college hockey.

Early season gauntlet
From the beginning of their campaign, the Terriers faced a difficult test. In their first eleven games, nine came against ranked teams. Despite the tall task, BU shot out to a 6–1 record and were ranked #1 just a month into the season. The team hit a bit of a rough patch in mid-November and lost three of four games. They dropped down to #8 in the polls but jumped back into the top 5 when they took a weekend series from arch-rival and then-#2 Boston College.

Piling up wins
After returning from the winter break, BU kicked off the second half of their season by winning the Denver Cup. After a poor performance against conference bottom-feeder Providence ten days later, BU went on a long streak and didn't lose another game for the rest of the regular season. The Terriers went 13–0–3 down the stretch and trounced most of their opponents. During their run, they also captured the Beanpot title, dropping #3 Northeastern in the process. By not losing, BU was able to rise up to #1 in the polls and finish atop the Hockey East standings by a single point.

Conference tournament
Despite being the prohibitive favorite for the NCAA title, BU faced tough challenge from 8th-seeded Maine in the quarterfinals. After eking out a narrow victory in game 1, the Terriers played one of their worst games of the year in the rematch and lost for the first time in over two months. Millan's 6 goals against was by far a season high and put the Terriers on the precipice of getting knocked out of the Hockey East tournament. The shocking loss appeared to wake up the team and they came storming back in the deciding game 3, scoring 6 goals in the first two periods and sailing to an easy victory.

The semifinal pitted BU against BC once more and, at least early-on, it appeared that the Eagles may finally have figured out how to defeat this year's team. The Terriers were held scoreless over the first 50 minutes of the game and were held in check by a stingy Boston College defense. In the second half of the third, BU's offense exploded for 3 goals in 44 seconds and took a 3–1 lead over the stunned BC squad. The Eagles were able to cut into the lead with a second goal just after a BU penalty had expired but Millan held the fort for the rest of the game and allowed the Terriers to escape with a win.

The championship game turned into a goaltending dual between Millan and Massachusetts–Lowell's Nevin Hamilton. It took almost all of the first period for Brandon Yip to net the Terriers' first marker but that was all BU could get past the River Hawk goalie. Fortunately, Millan stood on his head all game long and turned aside all 32 shots to earn a 1–0 shutout and the 31st victory on the year for the Terriers.

NCAA tournament
BU was given the #1 overall seed for the NCAA tournament, which was typically the kiss-of-death for a team's championship hopes. Since 1996, only Wisconsin in 2006 had won a championship as the top overall seed. While history may have been against them, The Terriers were able to open against a relatively weak Ohio State team and complete dominate the Buckeyes. BU scored the first six goals of the game and were able to relax in the second half, cruising to an 8–3 victory. They received goals from six different players but it was Matt Gilroy who led the way with 4 assists.

The Terriers' road grew much more difficult after the opening round breeze and they got a fight from conference-rival New Hampshire. The Wildcats limited BU to just 23 shots on the night but that didn't stop Corey Trivino from opening the scoring. UNH took over the second period and even the score but, uncharacteristically, it was the Wildcats that got into penalty trouble in the third. Jason Lawrence scored his 24th goal of the year on BU's second power play of the frame with just 15 seconds remaining in regulation to give the Terriers the win and send them to the Frozen Four for the first time in twelve years.

In the national semifinal against another conference rival, Vermont, BU got off to a tremendous start; they outshot the Catamounts 2:1 and led 2–0 after 20 minutes. While it appeared that the Terriers were on their way to another easy win, Vermont came charging back in the second, scoring three consecutive goals in a 6-minute span to take the lead. Vinny Saponari netter a power play goal just before the end of the period to tie the game. The Catamounts retook the lead mid-way through the third on their second power play goal of the game but Chris Higgins became the hero a few minutes later. He scored his 14th of the year on a rush to tie the game and then had Wilson score off of his rebound to put the Terriers ahead for good.

After the wild semifinal, only Miami remained and Boston University met the RedHawks for the championship. Chris Connolly opened the scoring in the first, however, true to form, the Terriers were hampered by having to kill 7 penalties during the game. While Miami wasn't able to score on any of the man-advantages, they were able to keep the Terriers hemmed in their zone for much of the time. The limited offensive opportunities enabled the RedHawks to tie the game in the second and then take a lead in the second half of the third. A third Miami goal with just over 4 minutes remaining in the match appeared to be the final nail in the coffin for BU. After calling a timeout, Parker pulled Kieran Millan with 3:32 remaining. Due to the tough defensing from Miami, it took a while for BU to establish themselves in the offensive zone but eventually they were able to leaky goal from a Zach Cohen backhander. With approximately one minute left, BU needed another goal to tie and the team appeared to be far more energetic. The Terriers were able to get into the Miami end fairly easily and passed the puck around with aplomb. Eventually the rubber made its way through a sea of lumber and legs to the stick of Nick Bonino who fired it into a half-open cage to tie the score with just 17 seconds remaining. The team's momentum carried over into the overtime where BU outshot Miami 9–4. About half way through the extra period, Colby Cohen fired a shot from the blueline but it was blocked by Kevin Roeder. The puck deflected off of Roeder's leg up into the air, causing Miami's goaltender Cody Reichard to lose track of the shot. The puck arched like a rainbow right over Reichard's shoulder and into the net, giving BU its 5th national championship and one of the more improbable comebacks in the history of all sports, let alone college hockey.

Departures

Recruiting

Roster
As of October 1, 2008.

|}

Standings

Schedule and results

|-
!colspan=12 style=";" | Exhibition

|-
!colspan=12 style=";" | 

|-
!colspan=12 ! style=""; | Regular Season

|-
!colspan=12 style=";" | 

|-
!colspan=12 ! style=""; | 

|-
!colspan=12 style=";" | 

|-
!colspan=12 style=";" |

National championship game

Scoring statistics

Goaltending statistics

Rankings

Note: USCHO did not release a poll in weeks 0, 24 and 25.

Awards and honors

Players drafted into the NHL

2009 NHL Entry Draft

† incoming freshman

References

Boston University Terriers men's ice hockey seasons
Boston University
Boston University
Boston University
Boston University
Boston University
Boston University
Boston University
Boston University